Colette Pichon Battle is a climate activist and lawyer, who founded the climate justice and human rights center The Gulf Coast Center for Law & Policy. She was a TED speaker, and a 2019 Obama Foundation fellow. She is best known for advocating for the needs of communities of color in the face of the Climate crisis in the Gulf Coast of the United States.

External links

Twitter page

References 

People from Louisiana
American women lawyers
American lawyers
Climate activists